Thiazine  is an organic compound containing a ring of four carbon, one nitrogen and one sulfur atom. There are three isomers of thiazine, 1,2-thiazine, 1,3-thiazine, and 1,4-thiazine, which differ by the arrangement of the nitrogen and sulfur atoms in the ring.

Derivatives of thiazine, often referred to as thiazines, are used for dyes, tranquilizers and insecticides.

Preparation 
1,4-thiazine can be prepared from the corresponding dione using aluminium powder at high temperature.

Tautomers 

Three tautomers of 1,4-thiazine exist as above.

See also
Methylene blue, contains a related ring with nitrogen and a positively charged sulfur atom
Phenothiazine, a thiazine fused with two benzene rings
Thiomorpholine, a saturated analog of thiazine

References